Raffaella Memo (born 27 October 1964) is an Italian rower. She competed in the women's quadruple sculls event at the 1984 Summer Olympics.

References

1964 births
Living people
Italian female rowers
Olympic rowers of Italy
Rowers at the 1984 Summer Olympics
Place of birth missing (living people)